Ta' Xbiex is a locality and Local Council in the Central Region of Malta with a population of 2148 (estimated 2019)  It is part of a small headland within the Marsamxett Harbour, right between the villages of Msida and Gżira.

Etymology 
It is said that the name Ta' Xbiex originates from it exact geographical location as it faces the rising sun. The Maltese word 'Tbexbex'  is descriptive of the sun as it rises. Others say its name might originate from word Xbiek''' meaning fishing nets as would seem appropriate from its inhabitants being able to sail and fish freely from its shores. Indeed, its coat of arms depicts a ship's wheel further confirming its connection with the sea.

 Important Buildings 
Many of the beautiful houses in Ta’ Xbiex house a number of  foreign embassies. The Whitehall Mansions has is a prestigious address, and an example of unique Maltese architecture. The building presently houses, amongst others, embassies of Egypt, Italy, Netherlands, Spain, Germany, Austria, Ireland, Australia and the British High Commission. In the 1950s it was known as The Wrennery being the residential quarters of the Woman's Royal Naval Service (WRNS).

There are also a number of service providers such as insurance companies, law firms, auditing and accounting firms.

Among the original villas situated in the streets opposite the sea, one finds Villa Oxania, which belonged to the noted physician and leading archaeologist, Sir Temi Zammit (1864-1935), and Villa Cloe, home to Sir Arturo Mercieca (1878-1969), long-time president of the Maltese Courts and a well known political leader. Both patriots died while they held residence at Ta' Xbiex.

 St. John of the Cross Church 
This church became a parish in 1969 and is run by the Carmelite Monks. Decorated in the Basilical and Roman style, it is known for its quite unique Crucifix which is 420 cm high and 240 cm wide. Put in place in 1971 this large steel Crucifix is based on a drawing by St. John of the Cross and  may be the largest reproduction of its kind and the only silhouette cross in the world.

 Yachting 
For many years in the 1950s various battleships were berthed in the Msida/Ta' Xbiex creek. From the 1960s right up until today, Ta' Xbiex hosts many private boats with people from all nationalities making this location their berthing home for short as well as long stays.

The Royal Malta Yacht Club, sits proudly on the Ta' Xbiex seafront and plays host to the very popular Rolex Middle Sea Race. Tracing its origins back to the 1800s, this yachting club now enjoys well equipped premises and facilities on a site it renovated in 2008. It also houses a 65 berth Yacht Marina in the same location.

Ta' Xbiex is also home to a 720 berth Msida and Ta' Xbiex Yacht Marina. Due to its stratic location, the marina is sought-after for its central location and the shelter afforded from the prevailing North-Westerly winds, while the breakwater protects against a North-Easterly swell.

Several marine services providers are also found in the area. There are a number of restaurants along the coast that take advantage of the location, catering for the yachting community whilst also offering spectacular harbour views of the Bastions in Valletta and Floriana.

 Sport 
Ta'Xbiex forms part of a sea-side promenada that runs from Pieta all the way to St Julians. It is a very popular route for runners who enjoy a backdrop of historical bastions, seaviews as well as busy city bustle as they move into Gzira, Sliema and St Julians.

 Local Council 
The Ta' Xbiex Local  Council is formed by the following:Mayor:  Maximillian ZammitDeputy Mayor: Oriana CallejaCouncillors:  Louise Cachia Castelletti

                      Eugenio Muscat

                      Rosario PortelliExecutive Secretary:''' Yasmine Tonna

Main roads
Triq Giuseppe Calì (Giuseppe Calì Street)
Triq Abate Rigord (Abate Rigord Street)
Triq Enrico Mizzi (Enrico Mizzi Street)
Triq il-Prinċipessa Margerita (Princess Margaret Street)
Triq il-Prinċipessa Eliżabetta (Princess Elizabeth Street)
Triq l-Ambaxxati (Embassy Road)
Triq Sir Augustus Bartolo (Sir Augustus Bartolo Street)
Triq San Ġwann tas-Salib (St. John of the Cross Street)
Triq Sir Ugo Mifsud (Sir Ugo Mifsud Street)
Triq L-Imradd
Triq Testaferrata (Testaferrata Street)
Rampa ta' Ta' Xbiex (Ta' Xbiex Terrace)
Vjal Sir Temi Zammit (Sir Temi Zammit Avenue)
Xatt Ta' Xbiex (Ta' Xbiex Coast Road)

References

Further reading
Mousù, S. (17 March 2019). Musing on Ta' Xbiex's origin and past.... The Sunday Times of Malta, pp. 54.

External links

 Ta' Xbiex Local Council
 St John of the Cross Parish Church

 
Towns in Malta
Local councils of Malta